The 2003 European Women Basketball Championship, commonly called EuroBasket Women 2003, was the 29th regional championship held by FIBA Europe. The competition was held in Greece and took place from September 19 to September 28, 2003. Russia won the gold medal and Czech Republic the silver medal while Spain won the bronze. Lucie Blahůšková from Czech Republic was named the tournament MVP.

Participating Teams

Group A

Group B

Venues

Qualification

Squads

Preliminary round

Group A (Pyrgos)

Group B (Amaliada)

Knockout stage

Championship bracket

5th place bracket

9th place bracket

Final standings

References
 FIBA Europe profile

 
Qualification for the 2004 Summer Olympics
2003–04 in European women's basketball
2003 in Greek women's sport
2003
2003
Sports competitions in Patras
September 2003 sports events in Europe
2003–04 in Greek basketball